Boronia rhomboidea, commonly known as the broad-leaved boronia or rhomboid boronia, is a plant in the citrus family Rutaceae and has a disjunct distribution in New South Wales and Tasmania in Australia. It is an erect, woody shrub with many branches, simple, broadly egg-shaped to almost circular leaves and groups of up to three white to pale pink, four-petalled flowers on the ends of the branches or in the axils of the upper leaves.

Description
Boronia rhomboidea is usually an erect, woody shrub with many branches that grows to a height of up to  but is sometimes prostrate. Its younger branches are covered with soft hairs. The flowers are white to pale pink and are arranged singly or in groups of up to three on the ends of the branches or in leaf axils usually without a peduncle. The stigma has four lobes and is slightly wider than the style.

Taxonomy and naming
Boronia rhomboidea was first formally described in 1905 by William Jackson Hooker from a specimen collected by Ronald Campbell Gunn on the "side of the Western Mountains". The description was published in Icones Plantarum. The specific epithet (rhomboidea) is derived from  Latin word rhombus meaning "an equilateral parallelogram with unequal pairs of
angles".

Distribution and habitat
The broad-leaved boronia grows in swampy heaths in New South Wales and Tasmania. It is found in the Tasmanian highlands and in New South Wales on the Southern Tablelands, mainly in the Budawang Range.

References 

rhomboidea
Flora of New South Wales
Flora of Tasmania
Plants described in 1848
Taxa named by William Jackson Hooker